Es hört nie auf is a pop/rock album by the Austrian band Schürzenjäger. It was released in 1999 by BMG Ariola Media GmbH.

Track listing

 Wir spielen alle in derselben Band (We All Play in the Same Band) — Müssig/Leis-Bendorff — 3:13
 Heute Traum - Morgen Wahr (A Dream Today - Tomorrow True) — Wolf — 3:42
 Macho-Mathik — Müssig/Leis-Bendorff — 3:27
 Unterwegs nach Nirgendland (On the Way to No-One's-Land) — Müssig/Kunze — 4:18
 Und aus Fremden werden Freunde (And Strangers Become Friends) — Müssig — 3:03
 Koa Zeit (No Time) — Gober — 3:08
 Uns kriegen sie nicht klein (They Won't Get Us Down) — Moll/Meinunger — 3:31
 Wenn du dich selber magst (If You Like Yourself) — Harwin/Slavik/Kemmler — 3:43
 Die Party is no lang net aus (The Party Isn't Over Yet) — Müssig — 3:21
 Hasta la Vista — Wolf — 3:27
 Zwischen allen Stühlen (Between All Chairs) — Müssig/Kunze — 3:39
 I glaub no immer an die Freundschaft (I Still Believe in Friendship) — Cox/Meinunger — 4:13
 Die Welt is koa Glashaus (The World is Not a Glass House) — Moll/Greiner — 3:33
 Es hört nie auf (It Never Ends) — Müssig/Leis-Bendorff — 4:38
 Bonustitel: Skalinada/Malinkonija (Medley) — Runjic — 3:12

1999 albums